Rose Petal Place was an American-produced animated film from 1984 made by Ruby-Spears, with a corresponding line of flower-themed dolls made by Kenner Products. The concept for Rose Petal Place was created by David Kirschner and the film was written by Mal Marmorstein. The film was directed by Charles August Nichols, and was released in syndication in May 1984.

History
Rose Petal Place was first introduced in the 1980s as an animated film which also included a corresponding toy line and playsets. Rose Petal dolls were markedly similar to the fruit and dessert-themed Strawberry Shortcake dolls, also made by Kenner. The Rose Petal dolls themselves were flower-themed and based on different types of flowers.

According to the toys' boxes and the movie, Rose Petal Place began a long time ago when a young girl (played by Nicole Eggert) was moving away from her lovely home and garden. She cried for her beloved garden because no one would be there to take care of her flowers. She didn't want them to perish, so she made a secret wish that the flowers would live forever. Out of this magical wish, combined with her tears of love, brought Rose Petal and all of her friends (Lily Fair, Daffodil, Orchid, Sunny Sunflower, and Iris) to life. Now living forever, Rose Petal and her friends reside in the garden and tend the little girl's flowers, but face trouble from the nefarious plots of Nastina the spider and her assistant Horace Fly.

Other accessories which were produced included lunchboxes, books, games, stickers, and various fashions for the dolls.

Characters
The primary characters of Rose Petal Place were:

 Rose Petal, a pink-haired, pink-clad doll whose singing keeps the other flowers alive. In the cartoon, Rose Petal was voiced by Marie Osmond.
 Sunny Sunflower, a yellow haired and clad tomboy who tells jokes to make the other flowers laugh. She is Rose Petal's closest companion. Voiced by Susan Blu.
 Lily Fair, a blue haired and clad ballet dancer. Voiced by Renae Jacobs.
 Daffodil, another yellow haired and clad doll, this one obsessed with finance. Voiced by Susan Blu.
 Orchid, a purple clad shopaholic with pale lavender hair. Voiced by Renae Jacobs.
 Iris, a purple and white clad painter of African ethnicity. Voiced by Candy Ann Brown.
 Nastina, a widow spider who attempts to thwart the flowers' happiness, and even to kill Rose Petal on one occasion. Nastina is assisted by a horse-fly, Horace, (voiced by Frank Welker) who didn't get a toy. Voiced by Marilyn Schreffler.
The animated special also featured five other characters, Elmer, an Elm tree who watches over the garden, Seymour J. Snailsworth, a wise and helpful snail, P.D. Centipede, a sports-oriented centipede (all voiced by Frank Welker), Tumbles, a friendly hedgehog and a lavender-colored kitten named Pitterpat.

Rose Petal Place: Real Friends (1985)
David Kirschner Productions and Ruby-Spears Enterprises created a second movie in 1985 called Rose Petal Place: Real Friends. The film was directed by Charles August Nichols. This second movie introduced six new characters, which Kenner scheduled to be released as dolls shortly after. Although prototypes and marketing samples were made, the entire line was discontinued before the dolls could hit the shelves.

The second series of unproduced dolls
 Cherry Blossom, an Asian character wearing a cherry pink kimono. She enjoys interior decorating.
 Sweet Violet, a light blue haired and clad actress.
 Fuchsia, a dark purple haired doll with fuchsia clothing and a taste for clothing design.
 Gladiola, a blonde doll with light pink clothes and a taste for tap dancing.
 Marigold, an orange haired and clad organizer of events.
 Canterbury Belle, a pink haired and clad baker.

Book and cassette episode list
In 1984, Parker Brothers put out a series of three books with accompanying cassette tapes, six books without cassettes, one Panorama book, and four coloring books, as well as the record.

A Concert at Carnation Hall

Also in 1984, Parker Brothers released an album with Marie Osmond reprising her role.

Track Listing
Side 1
 "Elmer's Song" (Tom and Stephen Chapin)
 "A Special Place" (Tom and Stephen Chapin)
 "Carnation Hall" (John Forster)
 "Nastina, The Beauty Queen (John Forster)
 "Little Bit Of Love (John Carney and Tom Chapin)
Side 2
 "Rehearsal Song" (Tom Chapin, Stephen Chapin and John Carney)
 "Coral Bells" (John Forster)
 "Amazing" (John Carney, John Forster, Stephen and Tom Chapin)
 "Look Inside" (John Forster)
 "If You Have Love In Your Heart" (John Carney)

Vocals
 Nastina - Evalyn Baron
 Male Character Voices - Russell Horton
 The Flowers - Marina Belica, Victoria Blumenthal, Jessica Craven, Katie Irving, Merle Miller
 Background - Stephen Chapin, Tom Chapin, The Suits

Personnel
 Stephen Chapin - producer
 Tom Chapin - producer
 Fannie H. Cromwell - executive producer
 William C. Coleburn - executive producer
 Jaime Chapin - production coordinator
 Gary Chester - engineer
 Tommy "Monst" Civello - assistant engineer

Musicians
 Piano - Warren Bernhardt, Stephen Chapin, Robbie Kondor
 Guitar - Tom Chapin, Georg Wadenius
 Banjo - Tom Chapin
 Bass - Wayne Pedzwater
 Drums - Richard Crooks, Barry Lazarowitz
 Synthesizer - Robbie Kondor
 Percussion - Brian Slawson
 Violins - Harry Cykman (concertmaster), Ann Barak, Glenn Dicterow, Harry Glickman, Raymond Gniewek, Regis Iandiorio, Gemma Sroczyńska
 Violas - Emanuel Vardi, Leonore Weinstock
 Celli - Jesse Levy, George Kim Scholes, Mark Shuman
 Flute/Piccolo - Barbara Hart, George Marge
 Oboe - Dennis Anderson, David Diggs, Alva Hunt
 English Horn - George Marge
 Clarinet - Al Regni, Dave Tofani
 Bass Clarinet - Albert Regni
 Bassoons - John Campo, Wally Kane
 French Horn - Mark Sonder, Brooks Tillotson, Lawrence Wechsler
 Trumpet - Danny Cahn, Robert Millikan
 Trombone - Dave Bargeron, Arthur Baron
 Tuba - David Braynard
 Harp - Margaret Ross

See also
 Flora (mythology)

References

External links
 Guide for the Dolls Released
 Rose Petal Place at IMDB
 Rose Petal Place: Real Friends at IMDB
 Entry at Ghost of the Doll

1984 films
1984 animated films
American children's films
Films based on toys
Doll brands
1980s toys
1980s American animated films
Films directed by Charles August Nichols
Films scored by Dean Elliott
Ruby-Spears
1980s English-language films